Kurdish Wikipedia refers to two Wikipedia editions which are written in two forms of Kurdish language; Kurmanji and Sorani.

The original one was founded in January 2004. There are also  two other Wikipedia editions for Zazaki and Southern Kurdish with the latter still in the test phase.

History 
The Kurdish Wikipedia established on January 7, 2004, designed to contain articles in Kurmanji and Sorani at the same time. On August 12, 2009, Kurdish Wikipedia separated into two versions due to technical and linguistic issues. The old version (ku.) remained as Kurmanji Kurdish Wikipedia and a new version (ckb.) created for Sorani Kurdish Wikipedia.

See also 
 Kurmanji Kurdish Wikipedia
 Sorani Kurdish Wikipedia
 Zazaki Wikipedia

Gallery

References

External links 

Kurdish (Kurmanji)
 Kurmanji Kurdish Wikipedia
 Kurmanji Kurdish Wikipedia mobile version
Kurdish (Sorani)
 Sorani Kurdish Wikipedia
 Sorani Kurdish Wikipedia mobile version
Wikimedia
 Kurdish Wikimedians User Group

Kurdish-language encyclopedias
Kurdish-language websites
Wikipedias by language
Internet properties established in 2004